Hannah Foster is the name of:

Hannah Webster Foster (1758–1840), American novelist
Hannah Foster (1985–2003), British murder victim; see Murder of Hannah Foster
Hannah Foster (UK politician), Conservative candidate for Exeter (UK Parliament constituency)